Matt Broadley is a Swedish director. He has made music videos for several songs that went #1 on the charts, like "All That She Wants" and "Mr. Vain".

Career
Broadley has directed many TV commercials and music videos. His clients include: 

Aldaris  
Arla
Caroli 
C MORE
Disney Channel
Energizer 
Kanal 5
Oriflame
SVT1 

SVT2
TV3 Sweden
TV4 Sweden  
TV6  
TV12
TV1000   
V75
Viasat

His music videos include videos for artists such as:

Ace of Base 
All Blue
B.G., the Prince of Rap 
Beverley Knight 
Culture Beat 
"Demons"
Dr Alban
Dune
E-Type 
Gina G
Herbie 
Inner Circle

Jam & Spoon
Jamie Cullum 
Joaquin Cortes
Leila K 
Magic Affair
Mark Oh
Masterboy 
MC Sar & The Real McCoy
M People 
Stella Getz
The Cardigans

Videography

Ace of Base - "All That She Wants" 
Ace of Base - "Don't Turn Around" 
Ace of Base - "Happy Nation" 
Ace of Base - "Living In Danger" 
Ace of Base - "Lucky Love"
Al Agami - "Deep Undercover"
B.G., the Prince of Rap - "The Colour of My Dreams"
Beagle - "Nine Out Of Ten"
Beagle - "When I Speak Your Name"
Beverley Knight - "Made It Back"
Cod Lovers - "In Limbo"
Culture Beat - "Anything"
Culture Beat - "Got to Get It"
Culture Beat - "Mr. Vain"
Culture Beat - "World in Your Hands"
Deep Fried - "Chanel Girl"
Deep Fried - "Trust My love"
Deep Fried & Rankin’ Roger - "Mirror In The Bathroom"
Dr Alban - "Look Who’s Talking!"
Dune - "Hand In Hand"
Dune - "Who Wants To Live Forever"
Electric Boys - "Do You Believe In Me"
E-Type - "Euro 2000"
E-Type - "Russian Lullaby"
E-Type - "This Is The Way"
Gina G - "Ti Amo"
Herbie- "I Believe"

Herbie - "Right Type of Mood"
Inner Circle - "Rock With You"
Inner Circle - "Wrapped Up In Your Love"
Intermission - "Everlasting Love"
Jam & Spoon - "Right in the Night"
Jamie Cullum - "These are the Days"
Joaquin Cortes - "Al Nagilasa"
Leila K - "Open Sesame"
Magic Affair - "Energy Of Light"
Mark Oh - "Tears Don't Lie"
Masterboy- "Mr Feeling"
MC Sar & The Real McCoy - "Runaway"
M People - "Fantasy Island"  
Rednex - "Wish You Were Here"
Silje - "Tell Me Where You’re Going"
Silje - "Fall"
Stella Getz - "Friends"
Stevie V - "Stevie V"
Søs Fenger - "You Let Me Down"
The Cardigans - "Carnival"
The Passengers - "7 Days 7 Nights"
The Sinners - "Love You More Than This"
Treble & Bass - "My Sweet Señorita"
Treble & Bass - "Swing"
Ultra - "Say It Once"
Verena - "Finally Alone"

References

External links
 
 
 Matt Broadley at Vimeo

Swedish film directors
Living people
Swedish art directors
Advertising directors
Swedish music video directors
Year of birth missing (living people)